Llanbadarn Fawr is a village and community in Ceredigion, Wales. It is on the outskirts of Aberystwyth next to Penparcau and Southgate. It forms the eastern part of the continually built-up area of Aberystwyth. It holds two electoral wards, Padarn and Sulien which elect a Ceredigion County Councillor each and several Llanbadarn Fawr Community Councillors. At the 2001 census its population as a community was recorded at 2,899, increasing to 3,380 at the 2011 census.

Attractions, history and amenities 
Llanbadarn Fawr is named after the church of Padarn (the great church of Padarn), and dates from the sixth century. It predates Aberystwyth, whose castle was originally named after Llanbadarn.

Notable buildings include Saint Padarn's Church, a fine, partly Romanesque parish church on the site of the mother church founded by Padarn (Paternus) in the 6th century and which contains notable 18th-century wall monuments. The Garreg Fawr stone slab, reputed to be the capstone of a now-vanished chamber tomb, is mounted on a plinth in Llanbadarn Fawr Square. This slab once stood on four upright stones before being fractured by fire in the 19th century, after which it was reassembled and mounted in its present location.

Llanbadarn Fawr has two pubs, The Black Lion and The Gogerddan Arms, and the University's Llanbadarn campus, which concentrates on subjects such as business, law, criminology and information science, and Coleg Ceredigion's Aberystwyth campus.

Padarn United F.C. play their football in the Cambrian Tyres League.

In the spring, summer and autumn months the village has train services provided by The Vale of Rheidol Railway to Devil's Bridge, Capel Bangor and Aberystwyth.

Governance
Much of the community falls within the electoral wards named Llandbadarn-Fawr-Padarn and Llandadarn-Fawr-Sulien. The total population of these wards is 3,380

Notable people 
 Tradition has it that the poet Dafydd ap Gwilym (ca. 1315/1320 – ca. 1350/1370) was born within Llanbadarn Fawr parish, as it stood in the fourteenth century, at Brogynin, Penrhyn-coch. He wrote about the parish church in his poem "The Girls of Llanbadarn". This church can still be visited today.
 John Rowlands (1824–1891), pen name, "Giraldus", was a Welsh antiquary and educator. He was born at Nanteos Arms.

Notes

External links
Llanbadarn Fawr Community Council website
www.geograph.co.uk : photos of Llanbadarn Fawr and surrounding area

Villages in Ceredigion
Aberystwyth